Minuscule 77 (in the Gregory-Aland numbering), A143 (von Soden), is a Greek minuscule manuscript of the New Testament, on parchment leaves. Palaeographically it has been assigned to the 11th century. It has complex contents and full marginalia.

Description 

The codex contains a complete text of the four Gospels with a commentary on 302 leaves (size ). The parchment is thin. The biblical text written in 21 lines per page, the text of commentary in 54 lines per page. It is written in very neat minuscule letters. The initial letters are in colour.

There is also a division according to the Ammonian Sections (in Mark 233 sections – the last in 16:8), and references to the Eusebian Canons (written below Ammonian Section numbers).

Lectionary markings (for liturgical use) and synaxaria added by a later hand.

Text 

The Greek text of the codex is a representative of the Byzantine text-type. Aland placed it in Category V.
It was not examined by the Claremont Profile Method.

History 

The manuscript once belonged to Matthias Corvinus, the great King of Hungary (1458-1490) (as codex 78). It was collated in 1773 by Treschow, and by Alter. Alter used it in his edition of the Greek text of the New Testament. C. R. Gregory saw it in 1887.

It is currently housed at the Austrian National Library (Theol. gr. 154), at Vienna.

See also 

 List of New Testament minuscules
 Biblical manuscript
 Textual criticism

References

Further reading 

 

Greek New Testament minuscules
11th-century biblical manuscripts
Biblical manuscripts of the Austrian National Library